Michael Helmrath (born 15 April 1954) is a German oboist and conductor and since the 2016/2017 season, active as General Music Director of the .

Life 
Born in Wuppertal, after studying oboe and conducting at the Hochschule für Musik und Tanz Köln, Helmrath first embarked on a career as an oboist, which led him as principal oboist to the Münchner Philharmoniker and Sergiu Celibidache, who recognised and promoted him as a conductor.

In 1989, he founded the Munich Philharmonic Chamber Orchestra, consisting of the first desks of the Munich Philharmonic Orchestra with its own concert series at the Philharmonie. From 2000 to 2015, he was general music director of the Brandenburger Symphoniker, which was nominated as "Orchestra of the Year" by the magazine Opernwelt under his direction.

In addition to the classical opera and concert repertoire, he also deals with Neue Musik, and numerous works were premiered under his direction. In addition, there exists numerous radio and television recordings, as well as CD recordings.

Since the 2016/2017 season, Helmrath has been the general music director of the Theater Nordhausen/Loh-Orchester Sondershausen tätig.

Professional positions

Positions 
 Solo oboist at the Münchner Philharmoniker
 Generalmusikdirektor of the Brandenburger Symphoniker
 Generalmusikdirektor of the Theater Nordhausen/Loh-Orchester Sondershausen

Guest conductor

Germany  
among others:
 Orchesterakademie Schleswig-Holstein Musik Festival
 Sächsische Staatskapelle Dresden
 
 Rundfunk-Sinfonieorchester Berlin
 Gürzenich Orchestra Cologne
 NDR Radiophilharmonie
 Kammerorchester Berlin
 Philharmonisches Staatsorchester Halle
 Stuttgarter Philharmoniker
 Hessisches Staatstheater Wiesbaden
 Nürnberger Symphoniker
 Thüringische Philharmonie
 Cologne Opera
 Hessisches Staatstheater Wiesbaden

Abroad 
among others:
 Jerusalem Symphony Orchestra
 China National Symphony Orchestra
 Daejeon Philharmonic Orchestra
 Gwangju Symphonic Orchestra
 Orchestra Sinfonica Sanremo
 Croatian National Theatre in Zagreb
 Rijeka Nationaltheater
 Ljubljana Summer Festival
 Miskolc Opera Festival

Recordings

References

External links 
 
 

German classical oboists
20th-century German conductors (music)
Music directors
1954 births
Living people
Musicians from Wuppertal